Bror Oscar Anders Modigh (10 February 1891 – 22 February 1956) was a Swedish track and field athlete who competed in the 1912 Summer Olympics. In 1912 he was eliminated in the first round of the 5000 metres competition.

References

External links
profile

1891 births
1956 deaths
Swedish male long-distance runners
Olympic athletes of Sweden
Athletes (track and field) at the 1912 Summer Olympics